Davoud Bahadori (born 14 January 1994) is an Iranian professional footballer.

Club career

Early years
Bahadori started his career with Saba. Later he joined Sepahan and spent two seasons with them.

Saba
He moved back to Saba in winter 2010. He made his debut for Saba Qom against Rah Ahan on September 20, 2013 as a substitute for Majid Houtan. He signed a three-year contract extension on July 1, 2014.

International career
Bahadori represented Iran U17 at the 2010 AFC U-16 Championship. He was a member of Iran U20 during 2011 to 2012.

Career statistics

References

External links
 

1994 births
Living people
People from Qom
Iranian footballers
Iran youth international footballers
Iran under-20 international footballers
Saba players
Persian Gulf Pro League players
Azadegan League players
Association football fullbacks